The Amazing World of Dr. Seuss Museum is a museum in Springfield, Massachusetts, United States located in the William Pynchon Memorial Building, which until 2009 housed the Connecticut Valley Historical Museum. The museum opened in June 2017. It is located on the Quadrangle along with the Dr. Seuss National Memorial Sculpture Garden and other museums.

History

Connecticut Valley Historical Museum 
In 1927 a new building was constructed to hold the collections of "natural, civil, military, literary, ecclesiastical and genealogical materials" belonging to The Connecticut Valley Historical Society, which had previously stored its collections at the City Library. It was designed by local architect Max Westhoff.

By 2007 plans had been made to renovate the building and repurpose it for a Dr. Seuss themed installation (later expanded into a full museum).

The Amazing World of Dr. Seuss Museum 
The museum currently operating in the building opened in June 2017.

Exhibits

The museum has several rooms on the main floor with interactive sculptures, exhibits, and original and reproduced artwork from Dr. Seuss. The upper level has original oil paintings, a recreation of Geisel's studio, complete with his drawing board and other original items, and family and fan correspondence. The basement, called Cat's Corner, has art workspace and copies of Dr. Seuss Books to read.

Controversy
The Seuss Museum was set to host a Children's Literature Festival featuring three children's authors, Lisa Yee, Mike Curato, and Mo Willems on October 14, 2017. On October 5, the three authors posted a statement on their Twitter accounts explaining their reason for canceling, namely, a recently painted mural featuring a Chinese racial stereotype from Seuss' first book And to Think That I Saw It on Mulberry Street. The museum canceled the event and also decided to remove the mural. The event was not rescheduled despite the authors thanking the museum for its quick action and offering to fulfill their speaking engagements.

External links

References

Museums in Springfield, Massachusetts
Dr. Seuss
Children's museums in Massachusetts
2017 establishments in Massachusetts
Literary museums in the United States